Natsuko Doi (born 15 March 1979 in Sapporo) is a Japanese snowboarder. She placed 14th in the women's snowboard cross event at the 2010 Winter Olympics.

References

1979 births
Living people
Japanese female snowboarders
Olympic snowboarders of Japan
Snowboarders at the 2010 Winter Olympics
21st-century Japanese women